Diadegma combinatum is a wasp first described by Holmgren in 1860.
No subspecies are listed.

References

combinatum
Insects described in 1860